Marco Antonio Gennari (born Parma, 5 July 1992) is an Italian rugby union player. His usual position is as a Wing and he currently plays for Valorugby Emilia in Top12.

In 2011 he was named in the Italy Under 20 squad.

References 

It's Rugby England Profile
Eurosport Profile
Ultimate Rugby Profile

1992 births
Living people
Sportspeople from Parma
Italian rugby union players
Valorugby Emilia players
Rugby union wings